The 2000–01 Scottish First Division was won by Livingston who were promoted to the Scottish Premier League. Greenock Morton and Alloa Athletic were relegated to the Second Division.

Table

Attendances

The average attendances for Scottish First Division clubs for season 2000/01 are shown below:

Scottish First Division seasons
1
2
Scot